Ashurst is a populated place situated in Graham County, Arizona, United States, and appears on the Eden U.S. Geological Survey Map.

History
Ashurst's population was 95 in 1940.

References

Populated places in Graham County, Arizona